Danionella is a genus of danionin fish found in freshwater habitats in Myanmar and West Bengal, India. It includes some of the smallest fishes.

Distribution
Four out of Five Described species of Danionella are found in Myanmar. D. translucida is described from the Ayeyarwady River basin, and D. mirifica was described from the Kaiming area in upper Myanmar. Danionella priapus can only be found in India.

Description
When first described, Danionella translucida was the smallest ostariophysan and the smallest adult vertebrate to inhabit fresh water. Its adult size ranges from 10–12 millimetres (.43–.47 in) SL. D. mirifica gets slightly larger, at about 14 mm (.55 in) SL, but is still one of the smallest freshwater fishes.

Danionella species lack scales and barbels,  but possess a lateral line.

D. mirifica has a single row of melanophores between the pelvic fins and the tips of the cleithra, and there is a lack of melanophores on the underside of the abdomen.

D. dracula reaches 17 mm in length. It is neotonous, lacking 44 bones that develop late in the related zebrafish Danio rerio. They have teeth made of bone, rather than the true teeth of other fishes, and the males have a pair of boney fangs which the use for sparring for mates. Britz et al. believe the lineage lost true teeth about 50 Ma.

Species 
 Danionella cerebrum Britz, Conway & Rüber, 2021
 Danionella dracula Britz, Conway & Rüber, 2009 (Dracula fish)
 Danionella mirifica Britz, 2003
 Danionella priapus Britz, 2009
 Danionella translucida T. R. Roberts, 1986

References